William Legue (born 4 May 1982) is a Swedish actor and script writer of Moroccan ancestry.

Actor William Legue is a former soccer player who by an incident slipped into an acting career after an injury. Since his first appearance on screen 2003 his versatility has been evidenced by the varied of films and roles he has undertaken, e.g. Kniven i hjärtat, SVT series Bron. and Hamilton - Men inte om det gäller din dotter. His mixed background as well as mastering Arabic, French, Swedish and English enables him to take on a vast variety of roles. Since the start Legue has been featuring in more than 14 movies and 3 larger theatre sets. The passion Legue has for film / theatre is shown in his role interpretations and also his way of working on the side as a script consultant. His stories has influenced screenwriters as well as directors and has been shown when working as a script consultant for inter alia the TV series Kniven i hjärtat directed by Agneta Fagerström-Olsson as well as for the new SVT production "Ettor och Nollor" 
written by Oskar Söderlund and directed by Johan Renck where Legue also landed one of the leading roles, Azad." "Ettor och Nollor" had its premiere February 9. 2014 on SVT but also a preview on January 30. 2014 at the Göteborg International Film Festival (2014).,

Legue is at the side of his acting very active within FC Ibra, a team in the sport of futsal indoor soccer and also an association that aims to inspire, motivate and develop kids and teenagers in Sweden. One important name for FC Ibra is Zlatan Ibrahimović who lent his name and supports this association. Legue is not only active on the field but also off as he continuously visit schools and meet youngsters to spread hope and dreams. Legue is for many youngsters a raw model and give the hope that anything is possible if you just believe in yourself.

Filmography 
(All movies in Swedish)

TV 
(All performances in Swedish)

Theatre
(All performances in Swedish)

References

External links

1982 births
Male actors from Stockholm
Living people
Swedish people of Moroccan descent